The Muzaffarpur - Narkatiaganj Express is an Express train belonging to East Central Railway zone that runs between Muzaffarpur Junction and Narkatiaganj Junction in India. It is currently being operated with 15215/15216 train numbers on a daily basis.

Service

The 15215/Muzaffarpur - Narkatiaganj Express has an average speed of 36 km/hr and covers 160 km in 4h 30m. The 15216/Narkatiaganj - Muzaffarpur Express has an average speed of 40 km/hr and covers 160 km in 4h.

Route and halts 

The important halts of the train are:

Coach composite

The train has standard ICF rakes with a max speed of 110 kmph. The train consists of 10 coaches :

 8 General Unreserved
 2 Seating cum Luggage Rake

Traction

Both trains are hauled by a Gonda Loco Shed based WDM 3A or Samastipur Loco Shed based WDM 3A diesel locomotive from Muzaffarpur to Narkatiaganj and vice versa.

Notes

See also 

 Muzaffarpur Junction railway station
 Narkatiaganj Junction railway station
 Patliputra - Narkatiaganj Intercity Express

References

External links 

 15215/Muzaffarpur-Narkatiaganj Express
 15216/Narkatiaganj-Muzaffarpur Express

Transport in Muzaffarpur
Transport in Narkatiaganj
Express trains in India
Rail transport in Bihar